The Lost Lie is a 1918 American short comedy film directed by King Vidor.

Cast
 Ruth Hampton
 Mike O'Rourke
 William Vaughn
 Judge Willis Brown (as himself)

Production
The Lost Lie is one of ten short films written and produced by Judge Willis Brown that were directed by King Vidor. They were filmed at Boy City Film Company in Culver City, California and released by General Film Company between January and May 1918.

Film historian and archivist Raymond Durgnat reports that all of Vidor’s films from the Judge Willis Brown series are lost, with the exception of Bud's Recruit of which one reel survives.

Theme
Brown was a Salt Lake City juvenile court judge who specialized in “rehabilitating juvenile offenders.” He based the series on his experiences operating his “Boy’s Cities” (not to be confused with Boys Town). The movies depict “inter-ethnic” city youth facing and resolving social and moral challenges constructively. Director Vidor declared that he "deeply believed" in the value of the films.

Footnotes

References
Baxter, John. 1976. King Vidor. Simon & Schuster, Inc. Monarch Film Studies. LOC Card Number 75-23544.
Durgnat, Raymond and Simmon, Scott. 1988. King Vidor, American. University of California Press, Berkeley.

External links

1918 films
Silent American comedy films
American black-and-white films
Films directed by King Vidor
1918 short films
American silent short films
1918 comedy films
American comedy short films
1910s American films